A pronic number is a number that is the product of two consecutive integers, that is, a number of the form  The study of these numbers dates back to Aristotle. They are also called  oblong numbers, heteromecic numbers, or rectangular numbers; however, the term "rectangular number"  has also been applied to the composite numbers.

The first few pronic numbers are:

0, 2, 6, 12, 20, 30, 42, 56, 72, 90, 110, 132, 156, 182, 210, 240, 272, 306, 342, 380, 420, 462 … .

Letting  denote the pronic number  we have  Therefore, in discussing pronic numbers, we may assume that  without loss of generality, a convention that is adopted in the following sections.

As figurate numbers

The pronic numbers were studied as figurate numbers alongside the triangular numbers and square numbers in Aristotle's Metaphysics, and their discovery has been attributed much earlier to the Pythagoreans.
As a kind of figurate number, the pronic numbers are sometimes called oblong because they are analogous to polygonal numbers in this way:

{| style="text-align: center"
|- valign="bottom"
|style="padding: 0 1em"| 
|style="padding: 0 1em"|    
|style="padding: 0 1em"|         
|style="padding: 0 1em"|                
|-
|1 × 2||2 × 3||3 × 4||4 × 5
|}

The th pronic number is the sum of the first  even integers, and as such is twice the th triangular number and  more than the th square number, as given by the alternative formula  for pronic numbers.  The th pronic number is also the difference between the odd square  and the st centered hexagonal number.

Since the number of off-diagonal entries in a square matrix is twice a triangular number, it is a pronic number.

Sum of pronic numbers
The partial sum of the first  positive pronic numbers is twice the value of the th tetrahedral number:

The sum of the reciprocals of the positive pronic numbers (excluding 0) is a telescoping series that sums to 1:

The partial sum of the first  terms in this series is

Additional properties
Pronic numbers are even, and 2 is the only prime pronic number. It is also the only pronic number in the Fibonacci sequence and the only pronic Lucas number.

The arithmetic mean of two consecutive pronic numbers is a square number:

So there is a square between any two consecutive pronic numbers. It is unique, since

Another consequence of this chain of inequalities is the following property. If  is a pronic number, then the following holds:

The fact that consecutive integers are coprime and that a pronic number is the product of two consecutive integers leads to a number of properties.

If 25 is appended to the decimal representation of any pronic number, the result is a square number, the square of a number ending on 5; for example, 625 = 252 and 1225 = 352. This is so because

.

References

Integer sequences
Figurate numbers